Sandra Hansson (born 2 April 1980) is a Swedish cross-country skier. In 2008 and 2009, she won the women's main Vasaloppet event. She has also been successful in roller skiing.

References 

1980 births
Swedish female cross-country skiers
Vasaloppet winners
Living people
20th-century Swedish women